Jagjit Singh (1941–2011) was an Indian ghazal singer, composer and musician.

Jagjit Singh may also refer to:

Jagjit Singh (activist) (1897–1976), Indian activist and entrepreneur
Jagjit Singh (cricketer) (born 1997), Indian cricketer
Jagjit Singh (field hockey) (1944–2010), Indian field hockey player
Jagjit Singh (politician) (1934–2015), Indian politician
Jagjit Singh (rower) (born 1966), Indian rower
Jagjit Singh (writer) (1912–2002), Indian writer
Jagjit Singh Anand (1921–2015), Indian communist activist, journalist, author
Jagjit Singh Aurora (1916–2005), Indian general
Jagjit Singh Chet (born 1961), Malaysian field hockey player
Jagjit Singh Chohan (c. 1929 – 2007), founder of the Khalistan movement
Jagjit Singh Chopra (1935–2019), Indian neurologist, medical writer, Emeritus Professor
Jagjit Singh Lyallpuri (1917–2013), Indian politician
Jagjit Singh Taunque, Deputy Lieutenant of the West Midlands
Pavandeep Singh Jagjit Singh (born 1998), Malaysian cricketer
Sri Satguru Jagjit Singh Ji (died 2012), supreme spiritual head of Namdhari Sikhs from 1959 to 2012
Tiger Jeet Singh (born 1944), Indian-Canadian wrestler

See also
Ajit Singh (disambiguation)
Jagatjit Singh
Jagjeet Singh
Jai Singh (disambiguation)
Jit Singh